Šimkūnaitė is a Lithuanian surname. Notable people with the surname include:

 Eugenija Šimkūnaitė (1920–1996), pharmacist, ethnographer, and herbalist
 Gabija Šimkūnaitė (born 2002), Lithuanian chess master

Lithuanian-language feminine surnames